Jai Krishan Singh Rouri is Deputy speaker of Punjab Assembly. He is second term MLA in the Punjab Legislative Assembly representing the Garhshankar Assembly constituency in Punjab, India, serving since 2017. He is a member of the Aam Aadmi Party. He won a second consecutive term in the 2022 Punjab Legislative Assembly election by margin of 4179 votes.

Early life
He worked as a farmer and a wedding photographer in Garhshankar.

Political career
He contested the 2017 Punjab Assembly elections on the Aam Aadmi Party ticket and defeated Surinder Singh Bhulewal Rathan of Shiromani Akali Dal. In 2022 he won in multi cornered election by a margin of more than 4000 votes.
On 30 June 2022 he was elected as Deputy Speaker of Punjab Vidhan Sabha.

Member of Legislative Assembly
He represents the Garhshankar Assembly constituency as MLA in Punjab Legislative Assembly since 2017. He was re-elected for a second term in 2022. The Aam Aadmi Party gained a strong 79% majority in the sixteenth Punjab Legislative Assembly by winning 92 out of 117 seats in the 2022 Punjab Legislative Assembly election. MP Bhagwant Mann was sworn in as Chief Minister on 16 March 2022.

On 30 June 2022, he was unanimously elected as the Deputy speaker in the 16th Punjab Assembly. AAP member Baljinder Kaur had proposed his name.

Committee assignments of Punjab Legislative Assembly
Chairman (2022–23) House Committee
Member (2022–23) Committee on Public Accounts
Member (2022–23) Committee on Estimates 
Member (2022–23) Committee on Public Undertakings

Electoral performance

References

External links
 Punjab Legislative Assembly Biography
 
 

Living people
Punjabi politicians
Punjab, India MLAs 2017–2022
Aam Aadmi Party politicians from Punjab, India
1983 births
Punjab, India MLAs 2022–2027